The 1911–12 Army Cadets men's basketball team represented United States Military Academy during the 1911–12 college men's basketball season. The head coach was Harvey Higley, coaching his first season with the Cadets. The team captain was Archibald Arnold.

Schedule

|-

References

Army Black Knights men's basketball seasons
Army
Army Cadets Men's Basketball Team
Army Cadets Men's Basketball Team